John Marvin Jones (February 26, 1882 – March 4, 1976) was a United States representative from Texas and a Judge of the United States Court of Claims.

Education and career

Born on February 26, 1882, in Valley View, Cooke County, Texas, Jones attended the common schools and then received a Bachelor of Arts degree in 1902 from John B. Denton College (now defunct), a Bachelor of Philosophy degree in 1905 from Southwestern University and a Bachelor of Laws in 1907 from the University of Texas School of Law and was admitted to the bar the same year. He entered private practice in Amarillo, Texas from 1908 to 1917. He was a member of the Texas Board of Legal Examiners for the Seventh Supreme Judicial District in 1913. He was a member of the Democratic National Congressional Campaign Committee. He was a United States Army private in Company A of the 308th Battalion of the Tank Corps in 1918.

Congressional service

Jones was elected as a Democrat to the 65th United States Congress and was reelected to the eleven succeeding Congresses and served from March 4, 1917, until his resignation on November 20, 1940, to become a judge of the United States Court of Claims. He was Chairman of the United States House Committee on Agriculture for the 72nd United States Congress through the 76th United States Congress.

Federal judicial service

Jones was nominated by President Franklin D. Roosevelt on April 9, 1940, to a Judge seat on the Court of Claims vacated by Judge Thomas Sutler Williams. He was confirmed by the United States Senate on April 10, 1940, and received his commission on November 20, 1940. His service terminated on July 9, 1947, due to his elevation to be Chief Justice of the same court.

Jones was on leave from the U.S. Court of Claims from 1943 to 1945, during his service as U.S. War Food Administrator.

Jones was nominated by President Harry S. Truman on January 20, 1947, to the Chief Justice seat on the Court of Claims vacated by Chief Justice Richard S. Whaley. He was confirmed by the Senate on July 8, 1947, and received his commission on July 9, 1947. Jones was reassigned by operation of law to the newly created Chief Judge seat on the renamed United States Court of Claims on September 1, 1948, pursuant to 62 Stat. 898. Jones was initially appointed as a Judge under Article I, but the court was raised to Article III status by operation of law on July 28, 1953, and Jones thereafter served as an Article III Judge. He was a member of the Judicial Conference of the United States from 1956 to 1964. He assumed senior status on July 14, 1964. His service terminated on March 4, 1976, due to his death in Amarillo. He was interred in Llano Cemetery.

Other service

Jones was on leave from the United States Court of Claims beginning January 15, 1943, to serve as adviser and assistant to the Director of the Office of Economic Stabilization until June 29, 1943, when he was appointed Administrator of the War Food Administration of the United States Department of Agriculture, serving until July 1, 1945, when he resumed his duties on the United States Court of Claims.

Jones served as a Special Master for the United States Supreme Court for Mississippi and Louisiana in 1965.

Honor

In 1980, President Jimmy Carter signed a bill naming Amarillo's federal court building the J. Marvin Jones Federal Building.

References

Bibliography and sources

External links

 
 (Written by a resident of Jones' hometown, Valley View, Texas.)

1882 births
1976 deaths
People from Amarillo, Texas
Judges of the United States Court of Claims
Southwestern University alumni
United States Article I federal judges appointed by Franklin D. Roosevelt
20th-century American judges
People from Cooke County, Texas
Democratic Party members of the United States House of Representatives from Texas
University of Texas School of Law alumni